This list of social sciences awards is an index to articles about notable awards given for contributions to social sciences in general. It excludes LGBT-related awards and awards for anthropology, archaeology, economics, geography, history, Information science, politics and political science, psychology and sociology, which are covered by separate lists. The list is organized by the country of the sponsoring organization, but awards may be given to people from other countries.

Awards

See also

 Lists of awards
 Lists of science and technology awards
 List of LGBT-related awards 
 List of anthropology awards
 List of archaeology awards
 List of economics awards
 List of geography awards
 List of history awards
 List of computer science awards#Information science awards
 List of politics awards
 List of psychology awards 
 List of sociology awards

References

 
social sciences